Platystomatinae is a subfamily of flies (Diptera) in the family Platystomatidae (Signal flies) that includes 80 genera, the largest subfamily with at last estimate,  species globally.

Subfamily classification
The Platystomatidae were comprehensively divided into five subfamilies, but more recent reviews of morphology suggest that some aspects of this classification are unsatisfactory. This led to reducing the number of subfamilies to four, being the Plastotephritinae, Platystomatinae, Scholastinae and Trapherinae Angitulinae being subsumed into Platystomatinae.
The most relevant diagnostic characters include: both the upper and lower calypters form a distinct lobe (in some genera these are equally undeveloped); the katepisternal setae absent; tergite 5 is well-developed; elongate terminal filaments on the sclerotised glans of the male distiphallus, each terminating in a gonopore.

Biology 
Members of the family Platystomatidae tend to occur in forest and forest margin habitat types, preferring shaded, densely-vegetated locations, while a few known from grassland or agricultural environments, sand dunes and other vegetation types. Adults of some genera can be found resting on the underside of foliage, while others utilise cryptic colouration and speckled wing patterns to escape detection on bark or rock surfaces.

Adults may be attracted to malodorous substances and decay, faeces, sap runs, decaying fruit, decaying snails  and even human sweat in the case of Lamprogaster Macquart  and Rivellia Robineau-Desvoidy.

Larvae are found on fresh and decaying vegetation, fruit, sugar cane, maize, coconuts, tree sap, carrion, human corpses, and root nodules, particularly in the genus Rivellia, which has economic implications for legume crops. There is a record in the Australian Museum (Sydney) of larvae of the genus Elassogaster attacking eggs capsules of migratory locust (Locusta migratoria).

Biogeography 
The largest concentration of Platystomatinae undoubtedly occurs in the Australasian region, followed closely by the Afrotropical region. The number of genera and species in the Oriental, European, Nearctic and Neotropical faunas are much more restricted.
 
Some genera are widely distributed over more than one region. For example, Plagiostenopterina Hendel, 1912, is widely distributed in the Old World tropics (Australasian, Oriental and Afrotropical regions) and Rivellia Robineau-Desvoidy, 1830 is almost cosmopolitan, although numbers of species in Europe are very restricted. Taxonomic revisions on such genera need to examine the wider implications of these broad distributions. Other genera a known from just a single location. Bama McAlpine, 2001, for example, is known only from New Guinea.

Genera 
Achias Fabricius, 1805
Aetha McAlpine, 2001
Amphicnephes Loew, 1873
Angelopteromyia Korneyev, 2001
Angitula Walker, 1859
Antineura Osten-Sacken, 1881
Apactoneura Malloch, 1930
Bama McAlpine, 2001
Brea Walker, 1859
Bromophila Loew, 1873
Carolimyia Malloch, 1931
Cleitamia Macquart, 1835
Cleitamoides Malloch, 1939
Clitodoca Loew, 1873
Coelocephala Karsch, 1888
Conicipithea Hendel, 1912
Dayomyia McAlpine, 2007
Duomyia Walker, 1849
Elassogaster Bigot, 1860
Engistoneura Loew, 1873
Eosamphicnephes Frey, 1932
Eumeka McAlpine, 2001
Euprosopia Macquart, 1847
Euthyplatystoma Hendel, 1914
Euxestomoea de Meijere, 1913
Himeroessa Loew, 1873
Hysma McAlpine, 2001
Icteracantha Hendel, 1912
Imugana Enderlein, 1937
Inium McAlpine, 1995
Laglaisia Bigot, 1878
Lambia Hendel, 1912
Lamprogaster Macquart, 1843
Lamprophthalma Portschinsky, 1892
Lophoplatystoma Hendel, 1914
Loxoceromyia Hendel, 1914
Loxoneura Macquart, 1835
Loxoneuroides Hendel, 1914
Lulodes Enderlein, 1924
Meringomeria Enderlein, 1924
Metoposparga Enderlein, 1924
Mezona Speiser, 1914
Microepicausta Hendel, 1914
Mindanaia Malloch, 1931
Montrouziera Bigot, 1860
Neoardelio Hendel, 1914
Neoepidesma Hendel, 1914
Oedemachilus Bigot, 1860
Palpomya Robineau-Desvoidy, 1830
Par McAlpine, 2001
Peltacanthina Enderlein, 1912
Peronotrochus Enderlein, 1924
Philocompus Osten-Sacken, 1881
Phlebophis Frey, 1932
Phytalmodes Bezzi, 1908
Picrometopus Frey, 1932
Plagiostenopterina Hendel, 1912
Platystoma Meigen, 1803
Pogonortalis Hendel in de Meijere, 1911
Polystodes Robineau-Desvoidy, 1830
Prosthiochaeta Enderlein, 1924
Pseudepicausta Hendel, 1914
Pseudocleitamia Malloch, 1939
Pseudorichardia Hendel, 1911
Rhytidortalis Hendel, 1914
Rivellia Robineau-Desvoidy, 1830
Scelostenopterina Hendel, 1914
Scotinosoma Loew, 1873
Senopterina Macquart, 1835
Signa McAlpine, 2001
Sors McAlpine, 2007
Sphenoprosopa Loew, 1873
Steyskaliella Soós, 1978
Tarfa McAlpine, 2001
Terzia McAlpine, 2001
Valonia Walker, 1856
Xenaspis Osten-Sacken, 1881
Xenaspoides Frey, 1930
Zealandortalis Malloch, 1939

References

External links 
 Biolib

Brachycera subfamilies
Platystomatidae
Taxa named by Ignaz Rudolph Schiner